Aukštojas Hill is the highest point in all of Lithuania; it is located in the Medininkai Highlands, Migūnai forestry, approximately  southeast of the capital city of Vilnius. In 1985, suspicions were raised by Rimantas Krupickas, a Lithuanian geographer, that Juozapinė Hill was not actually Lithuania's highest elevation.

The designated use of the land where Aukštojas Hill is situated has been changed by the Vilnius county governor from agricultural to tourism and cultural. The summit of the hill features a grove of pine trees. The public institution 'Lietuvos viršūnės', headed by Vladas Vitkauskas, Lithuania's leading mountaineer, is pursuing efforts to designate Aukštojas Hill as a geographic landmark in the historically important Medininkai region.

The name 'Aukštojas' was suggested by Libertas Klimka, a professor of history at the Vilnius Pedagogical University, and was the winner of a contest to decide the best name for the newly discovered elevation. Aukštėjas (Aukštojas, Aukštujis) was one of the most important deities in ancient Lithuanian mythology; he was considered the creator of the world. The hill was 'baptised' on June 20, 2005, during an unofficial ceremony. The name was officially approved by the Vilnius Region Municipality Council on November 18, 2005.

An alternate name, 'Aukštėjas Hill', was discarded as a nominee by the State Commission on the Lithuanian language, on the grounds that its suffix ("-ėj-") was not standard usage for a place-name; 'Aukštėjas' has been approved by the commission only as a name for the deity.

References

External links 
  On the Lithuanian War-path to Aukštėjas Hill - Libertas Klimka's article on the history behind the Aukštojas Hill issue
  The new highest hill in Lithuania - Lithuanian internet media on the new highest elevation
  Excerpt from the Activity Report of the State Commission on the Lithuanian language - The commission's approval of 'Aukštojas' as the morphologically most acceptable spelling variant of the place-name
   United Nations Working Paper: Geographical names in the Baltic nations

Hills of Lithuania
Landmarks in Lithuania
Highest points of countries